Natalia Krestianinova is a Russian former pair skater. She is a three-time (1990–1992) World Junior champion with partner Alexei Torchinski.

Competitive highlights
(with Torchinski)

References

Navigation

Russian female pair skaters
Soviet female pair skaters
Living people
World Junior Figure Skating Championships medalists
Year of birth missing (living people)